Emplectanthus is a genus of flowering plants belonging to the family Apocynaceae.

Its native range is Southern Africa.

Species:

Emplectanthus cordatus 
Emplectanthus dalzellii 
Emplectanthus gerrardii

References

Apocynaceae
Apocynaceae genera
Taxa named by N. E. Brown